Guimarães ( or ) is a Portuguese surname. Notable people with the surname include:

Agberto Guimarães (born 1957), Brazilian middle-distance runner
Alencar Guimarães (1865–1940), Brazilian lawyer and politician
Alexandre Guimarães (born 1959), Brazilian-Costa Rican football player and manager
Antônio Guimarães (1900–1975), Brazilian sports shooter
Artur Victor Guimarães (born 1998), Brazilian footballer
Bernardo Guimarães (1825–1884), Brazilian poet and novelist
Bruno Guimarães (born 1997), Brazilian footballer
Carlos Guimarães (1898–?), Portuguese former footballer
Daniel Guimarães (born 1987), Brazilian footballer
Darcy Guimarães (1915–1981), Brazilian hurdler
Djalma Guimarães (1894–1973), Brazilian geochemist
Durval Guimarães (born 1935), Brazilian former sport shooter
Edson Izidoro Guimarães (born 1957), Brazilian serial killer
Elina Guimarães (1904–1991), Portuguese feminist and writer
Flávio Guimarães (born 1963), Brazilian composer, harmonica player and singer
Gabriela Guimarães (born 1994), Brazilian volleyball player
Getúlio Teixeira Guimarães (1937–2020), Brazilian Roman Catholic priest
Gustavo Guimarães (born 1994), Brazilian water polo player
Hélder Guimarães (born 1982), Portuguese magician and illusionist
Ingrid Guimarães (born 1972), Brazilian actress
Jonas Guimarães (born 1951), Brazilian politician
José Guimarães (disambiguation), multiple people
Lúcia Guimarães (born 1957), Brazilian journalist
Luiz Fernando Guimarães (born 1949), Brazilian actor
Manuel Guimarães (1915–1975), Portuguese filmmaker
Marcelo Guimarães (born 1983), Brazilian mixed martial artist 
Natália Guimarães (born 1984), Brazilian actress
Nilo Guimarães (born 1954), São Toméan businessman and politician 
Nilo Guimarães (basketball) (born 1957), Brazilian basketball player 
Oriovisto Guimarães (born 1945), Brazilian politician 
Oswaldo Guimarães (born 1989), Brazilian handball player 
Pedro Guimarães (born 1971), Brazilian economist
Philippe Guimarães (born 1991), Brazilian footballer
Plauto Guimarães (1925–1972), Brazilian Olympic swimmer
Regina Guimarães (born 1957), Portuguese poet, playwright, stage director and lyricist
Ricardo Cardoso Guimarães (born 1959), Brazilian former basketball player
Ricardo Guimarães (born 1995), Portuguese footballer
Ricardo Guimarães (athlete) (1909–1974), Brazilian sprinter
Rodolfo Guimarães (1866–1918), Portuguese army officer and historian of mathematics
Serafim Guimarães (born 1934), Portuguese physician and pharmacologist
Sonia Guimarães (born 1957), Brazilian professor
Suely Guimarães (born 1957), Brazilian paralympic athlete
Tuca Guimarães (born 1973), Brazilian football manager
Ubiratan Guimarães (1943–2006), Brazilian politician and colonel
Ulysses Guimarães (1916–1992), Brazilian politician and lawyer
Vitorino Guimarães (1876–1957), Portuguese economist and politician
Wálter Guimarães (1913–1979), Brazilian footballer
Wesley Guimarães (born 1995), Brazilian actor

Portuguese-language surnames